Chowtash (also Romanized as Chowtāsh, Chootash, and Chūtāsh; also known as Chartāsh) is a village in Abrumand Rural District, in the Central District of Bahar County, Hamadan Province, Iran. At the 2006 census, its population was 978, in 195 families.

References 

Populated places in Bahar County